The 2005 Pittsburgh Steelers season was the franchise's 73rd season as a professional sports franchise and as a member of the National Football League (NFL). It was the 6th season under the leadership of general manager Kevin Colbert and the 14th under head coach Bill Cowher. The Steelers failed to improve upon their 15–1 record from 2004 and in 2005, the Steelers struggled. At one point, they were 7–5 and in danger of missing the playoffs but rose to defeat the Chicago Bears  on December 11 and started a four-game win streak to finish the season at 11–5.

The Steelers qualified for the playoffs as a wild-card team as the #6 seed and became just the second team ever (and the first in 20 years) to win three games on the road after they beat the #3 seed Cincinnati Bengals (11–5), the top-seeded Indianapolis Colts (14–2), and the #2 seed Denver Broncos (13–3) to become the American Football Conference representative in Super Bowl XL.  They defeated the NFC champion Seattle Seahawks in  Super Bowl XL to secure their league-tying fifth Super Bowl title. In doing so, they also became the only team at the time since the 1970 AFL-NFL merger to win a Super Bowl without playing a single home playoff game; though the New York Giants would repeat the feat two years later.

Personnel

Staff

Notable additions include Heath Miller and Nate Washington.

Roster

2005 NFL Draft

Preseason

Schedule

Regular season

Schedule

Game summaries

Week 1 (Sunday September 11, 2005): vs. Tennessee Titans

at Heinz Field, Pittsburgh, Pennsylvania

 Game time: 1:00 p.m. EDT
 Game weather: 76 °F (Mostly Sunny)
 Game attendance: 62,931
 Referee: Gerald Austin
 TV announcers: (CBS) Kevin Harlan (play by play), Randy Cross (color commentator)

Ben Roethlisberger became the NFL's first quarterback since Trent Green in 2003 to post a perfect (158.3) passer rating, and college backup Willie Parker put up 161 rushing yards and a touchdown in a dazzling NFL debut.

Week 2 (Sunday September 18, 2005): at Houston Texans

at Reliant Stadium, Houston, Texas

 Game time: 1:00 p.m. EDT
 Game weather: 95 °F (Sunny)
 Game attendance: 70,742
 Referee: Bill Vinovich
 TV announcers: (CBS) Don Criqui (play by play), Steve Tasker (color commentator)

Pittsburgh strong safety Troy Polamalu led a defensive onslaught with a career-high three of the Steelers' eight sacks, and Willie Parker followed up his outstanding NFL debut with 111 rushing yards and a touchdown on 25 carries as the Steelers hammered the Texans.

As the game took place on a hot, humid day, the Texans left the roof of Reliant Stadium open in the hopes that the Steelers' performance would be hampered by their black jerseys. However, the tactic failed and Houston fans were angered by having to sit in sweltering conditions and watch their team lose.

Week 3 (Sunday September 25, 2005): vs. New England Patriots

at Heinz Field, Pittsburgh, Pennsylvania

 Game time: 4:15 p.m. EDT
 Game weather: 82 °F (Cloudy)
 Game attendance: 64,868
 Referee: Bill Carollo
 TV announcers: (CBS) Jim Nantz (play by play), Phil Simms (color commentator), Bonnie Bernstein (sideline reporter)

New England quarterback Tom Brady led a five-play, 37-yard drive to Adam Vinatieri's game-winning 43-yard field goal with :01 remaining. The drive countered Hines Ward's 4-yard scoring catch that tied the score at 20–20, but left 1:25 for Brady to march the Patriot offense. On the day, Brady completed 31 of 41 passes for 372 yards, with an interception.

Week 4 (Sunday October 2, 2005): Bye Week

Week 5 (Monday October 10, 2005): at San Diego Chargers

at Qualcomm Stadium, San Diego, California

 Game time: 9:00 p.m. EDT
 Game weather:
 Game attendance: 68,537
 Referee: Jeff Triplette
 TV announcers: (ABC) Al Michaels (play by play), John Madden (color commentator), Sam Ryan (sideline reporter)

Jeff Reed booted a 40-yard field goal with :06 remaining to lift the Steelers to a win, but a play late in the game caused star quarterback Ben Roethlisberger to leave with a hyperextended knee and left his availability for the following week in doubt. The hit came from Charger rookie defensive lineman Luis Castillo and forced Roethlisberger to the sideline, and backup Charlie Batch merely handed off to Jerome Bettis three times to set up Reed's kick.

Week 6 (Sunday October 16, 2005): vs. Jacksonville Jaguars

at Heinz Field, Pittsburgh, Pennsylvania

 Game time: 1:00 p.m. EDT
 Game weather: 54 °F (Partly Sunny)
 Game attendance: 63,891
 Referee: Terry McAulay
 TV announcers: (CBS) Dick Enberg (play by play), Dan Dierdorf (color commentator), Armen Keteyian (sideline reporter)

Tommy Maddox capped a poor performance by throwing an overtime pass into a crowd of Jaguar defenders, and Rashean Mathis made him pay dearly, intercepting the pass and returning it 41 yards for the game-winning touchdown. Subbing for an injured Ben Roethlisberger (hyperextended knee), Maddox completed just 11 of 28 passes for 154 yards, with a touchdown and three interceptions.

Week 7 (Sunday October 23, 2005): at Cincinnati Bengals

at Paul Brown Stadium, Cincinnati, Ohio

 Game time: 1:00 p.m. EDT
 Game weather:
 Game attendance: 66,104
 Referee: Tony Corrente
 TV announcers: (CBS) Kevin Harlan (play by play), Randy Cross (color commentator)

Pittsburgh regrouped following a sloppy first quarter to take an easy win in Cincinnati. After allowing two marches into the Steeler red zone, the defense tightened and gave up only two field goals, then coasted on the heels of two Ben Roethlisberger touchdown strikes and 131 rushing yards from Willie Parker.

Week 8 (Monday October 31, 2005): vs. Baltimore Ravens

at Heinz Field, Pittsburgh, Pennsylvania

 Game time: 9:00 p.m. EST
 Game weather: 56 °F (Partly Cloudy)
 Game attendance: 64,187
 Referee: Pete Morelli
 TV announcers: (ABC) Al Michaels (play by play), John Madden (color commentator), Sam Ryan (sideline reporter)

Underachieving against a Ravens team missing defensive standouts Ray Lewis and Ed Reed, the Steelers regrouped on the heels of a late 60-yard drive that set up Jeff Reed's game-winning 37-yard field goal with 1:36 remaining. Ben Roethlisberger completed 18 of 30 passes for 177 yards, 2 touchdowns and an interception.

Week 9 (Sunday November 6, 2005): at Green Bay Packers

at Lambeau Field, Green Bay, Wisconsin

 Game time: 4:15 p.m. EST
 Game weather:
 Game attendance: 70,607
 Referee: Ed Hochuli
 TV announcers: (CBS) Jim Nantz (play by play), Phil Simms (color commentator), Bonnie Bernstein (sideline reporter)

With Charlie Batch starting at quarterback for an injured Ben Roethlisberger (knee), the Steelers capitalized on Packer mistakes – three turnovers – and won despite a lackluster offensive showing. The game's highlight came from Troy Polamalu, whose sack of Brett Favre forced a fumble that Polamalu himself scooped up and returned 77 yards for a second-quarter touchdown.

Week 10 (Sunday November 13, 2005): vs. Cleveland Browns

at Heinz Field, Pittsburgh, Pennsylvania

 Game time: 8:30 p.m. EST
 Game weather: 57 °F (Cloudy)
 Game attendance: 63,491
 Referee: Larry Nemmers
 TV announcers: (ESPN) Mike Patrick (play by play), Joe Theismann and Paul Maguire (color commentators), Suzy Kolber (sideline reporter)

The Steelers handled the division-rival Browns despite another serious quarterback injury. Backup Charlie Batch, subbing for Ben Roethlisberger, broke his hand late in the first half and exited. Beleaguered third-stringer Tommy Maddox inherited a 17–7 third-quarter lead and, despite some miscues, cruised to the win. Wide receiver (and college quarterback) Antwaan Randle El completed a 51-yard scoring pass to Hines Ward in the third, making Ward the team's all-time receptions leader (passing Hall of Fame wideout John Stallworth).

Week 11 (Sunday November 20, 2005): at Baltimore Ravens

at M&T Bank Stadium, Baltimore, Maryland

 Game time: 1:00 p.m. EST
 Game weather:
 Game attendance: 70,601
 Referee: Ron Winter
 TV announcers: (CBS) Ian Eagle (play by play), Solomon Wilcots (color commentator)

An anemic offensive showing led to a surprising Steeler defeat at the hands of the Ray Lewis-less Ravens. Third-team quarterback Tommy Maddox got the starting nod and completed 19 of 36 passes for 230 yards, with a touchdown and an interception (a bizarre play that caromed off of wideout Hines Ward's swinging foot and was snatched by Terrell Suggs), but the Steelers' inability to handle the Raven pass rush was a serious blow. Maddox was sacked six times and under nearly constant duress. Matt Stover won the game on a 44-yard field goal in overtime.

Week 12 (Monday November 28, 2005): at Indianapolis Colts

at RCA Dome, Indianapolis, Indiana

 Game time: 9:00 p.m. EST
 Game weather: Dome
 Game attendance: 57,442
 Referee: Bill Leavy
 TV announcers: (ABC) Al Michaels (play by play), John Madden (color commentator), Sam Ryan (sideline reporter)

The banged-up Steelers were simply no match for the undefeated Colts on Monday Night. Indianapolis' first offensive play proved a harbinger for the Steelers, with Marvin Harrison scorching Pittsburgh cornerback Ike Taylor on an 80-yard touchdown strike and a 7–0 advantage. Ben Roethlisberger's return from a two-game absence (knee injury) was a shaky one; his first interception potentially caused a six-point swing, snuffing out a Steeler drive late in the first half and setting up the Colts to kick a field goal, taking a 16–7 lead into the break. Roethlisberger's struggles were heightened when injured left tackle Marvel Smith grew less and less able to deal with All-Pro Colt pass rusher Dwight Freeney & Co., and eventually left with an ankle injury.

Week 13 (Sunday December 4, 2005): vs. Cincinnati Bengals

at Heinz Field, Pittsburgh, Pennsylvania

 Game time: 1:00 p.m. EST
 Game weather: 30 °F (Flurries)
 Game attendance: 63,044
 Referee: Bernie Kukar
 TV announcers: (CBS) Dick Enberg (play by play), Dan Dierdorf (color commentator), Armen Keteyian (sideline reporter)

Ben Roethlisberger put up the most prolific numbers of his young career in his return from a knee injury, but he was ultimately out dueled by Carson Palmer. Roethlisberger outpassed his counterpart 386–227 and each threw three touchdowns, but his three interceptions were backbreakers. Ultimately, the Bengals simply made too many big plays, including a 94-yard kickoff return by Tab Perry, for the Steelers to keep pace.

Week 14 (Sunday December 11, 2005): vs. Chicago Bears

In a snowy atmosphere, the Steelers snapped their three-game losing streak by ending the Bears' eight-game winning run. Jerome Bettis churned through the snow and mud for a season-high 101 rushing yards, scoring twice in the physical win.

Week 15 (Sunday December 18, 2005): at Minnesota Vikings

at Hubert H. Humphrey Metrodome, Minneapolis, Minnesota

 Game time: 1:00 p.m. EST
 Game weather: Dome
 Game attendance: 64,136
 Referee: Ed Hochuli
 TV announcers: (CBS) Kevin Harlan (play by play), Randy Cross (color commentator)

Desperately trying to keep pace in the AFC playoff picture, the Steelers again dominated an NFC North opponent and again snapped a winning streak. The Vikings had won six straight games, but were pounded up and down the field in losing to Pittsburgh. The Steelers forced three Minnesota turnovers and added a safety in the victory.

Week 16 (Saturday December 24, 2005): at Cleveland Browns

at Cleveland Browns Stadium, Cleveland, Ohio

 Game time: 1:00 p.m. EST
 Game weather: 45 °F (Cloudy)
 Game attendance: 73,136
 Referee: Bill Carollo
 TV announcers: (CBS) Gus Johnson (play by play), Steve Tasker (color commentator)

The Steelers turned a nearly flawless performance into a dominating win in Cleveland. The Browns were sacked eight times and were never really in the game. Willie Parker's 80-yard touchdown scamper in the third quarter broke the game open at 27–0. Ben Roethlisberger completed 13 of 20 passes for 226 yards and a touchdown before giving way to Charlie Batch with the game well in hand.

Week 17 (Sunday January 1, 2006): vs. Detroit Lions

at Heinz Field, Pittsburgh, Pennsylvania

 Game time: 1:00 p.m. EST
 Game weather: 37 °F (Partly Sunny)
 Game attendance: 63,794
 Referee: Walt Coleman
 TV announcers: (FOX) Ron Pitts (play by play), Tim Ryan (color commentator)

Mere weeks after being all but counted out in an extremely tight AFC playoff race, the Steelers clinched a Wild Card berth, trading punches with lowly Detroit and coming out on top. Unexpectedly, the 5–10 Lions leapt to a 14–7 first-quarter lead on two Joey Harrington touchdown passes, but Jerome Bettis tied the game later in the period with the first of his three touchdown runs in his final game in Pittsburgh. Bettis and Willie Parker combined for 176 rushing yards as the Steelers closed out their regular season.

Playoffs

Game summaries

AFC Wild Card Playoffs: at (#3) Cincinnati Bengals

Carson Palmer was injured early on in a tackle by Kimo von Oelhoffen

AFC Divisional Playoffs: at (#1) Indianapolis Colts

The Steelers became the first No. 6 playoff seed (since the league expanded to a 12-team playoff format in 1990) to defeat a No. 1 seed, and also the first No. 6 seed to reach a conference championship game.

Roethlisberger's game-saving tackle on Harper would later be known as "The Immaculate Redemption" or just "The Tackle".

AFC Championship: at (#2) Denver Broncos 

at Invesco Field at Mile High, Denver, Colorado

 Game time: 3:00 p.m. EST
 Game weather: 40 °F (Partly Sunny)
 Game attendance: 76,775
 Referee: Terry McAulay
 TV announcers: (CBS) Jim Nantz (play by play), Phil Simms (color commentator), Bonnie Bernstein and Armen Keteyian (sideline reporters)

Super Bowl XL: vs. (N1) Seattle Seahawks 

at Ford Field, Detroit, Michigan

 Game time:  6:30 p.m. EST
 Game weather: Dome
 Game attendance: 68,206
 Referee: Bill Leavy
 TV announcers:  (ABC) Al Michaels (play by play), John Madden (color commentator), Michele Tafoya and Suzy Kolber (sideline reporters)
The Pittsburgh Steelers became the 4th wild card team to win the Super Bowl. Hines Ward got the Super Bowl MVP recording 5 catches 143 yards and a touchdown.

Standings

Honors and awards

Pro Bowl representatives
See: 2006 Pro Bowl

 No. 43 Troy Polamalu- Strong Safety
 No. 55 Joey Porter- Outside Linebacker
 No. 64 Jeff Hartings- Center
 No. 66 Alan Faneca- Offensive Guard
 No. 98 Casey Hampton- Nose Tackle

References

External links 
 2005 Pittsburgh Steelers season at Pro Football Reference 
 2005 Pittsburgh Steelers season statistics at jt-sw.com 

Pittsburgh
Pittsburgh Steelers seasons
American Football Conference championship seasons
Super Bowl champion seasons
Pitts